Close Up is Joey's eleventh Cantonese studio album. The album includes Joey's No. 1 single/plug, “華麗邂逅 (Unexpected Splendid Meeting)”. This is also the first time Joey co-produced some of her songs on an album, under the name JY. It is her most successful album in terms of chart performance, with three 4 station No. 1 plugs, and two songs that placed within CRHK's Top Ten Songs of the Year, 華麗邂逅 in 2006 and 愛一個上一課 in 2007.

As compared to the Hong Kong release, the China release of the album had a song removed due to lyrics that were too sexual in nature.

Track listing
 心花怒放 Elated Heart (Broadway Electronics Commercial Theme)
 華麗邂逅 Splendid Encounter (Maxim's Mooncake Commercial Theme)
 愛一個上一課 Each Lover is a Love Lesson
 搖搖搖 Shake Shake Shake
 Be True
 傷神 Exhausting
 喜喜 Happy Happy
 卸妝 Removing Makeup
 如果睡袍太少布 If the Nightgown Is Too Thin
 蒸餾 Distillation
 黃色大門 The Big Yellow Door

Chart history

References

Joey Yung albums
2006 albums